A song plugger or song demonstrator was a vocalist or piano player employed in the early 20th century by department stores, music stores and song publishers to promote and help sell new sheet music, which was how hits were advertised before good-quality recordings were widely available. Music publisher Frank Harding has been credited with innovating the sales method. Typically, the pianist sat on the mezzanine level of a store and played whatever music was sent up to him by the clerk of the store selling the sheet music. Patrons could select any title, have it delivered to the song plugger, and get a preview of the tune before buying it.

Although the terms are often used interchangeably, those who worked in department and music stores were most often known as "song demonstrators", while those who worked directly for music publishers were called "song pluggers."

Musicians and  composers who had worked as song pluggers included George Gershwin, Ron Roker, Jerome Kern, Irving Berlin and Lil Hardin Armstrong. Movie executive Harry Cohn had been a song plugger.

Modern usage 
Later, the term was used to describe individuals who would pitch new music to performers, with The New York Times describing such examples as Freddy Bienstock performing a job in which he was "pitching new material to bandleaders and singers". In 1952, Ernest Havemann wrote:

 There are about 600 song-pluggers in the U.S.; they have their own union; they are powerful enough to bar all outsiders; and they command fees up to $35,000 a year [worth $ today] plus unlimited expense accounts. Their job is to persuade the record companies to use songs, put out by their publishing houses, and the radio station disk jockeys to play the records."

Song plugging remains an important part of the industry. Record labels and managers will actively search for songs that their artist can record, release and perform, especially in the case of those performers who don't write their own material.

References
Notes

Bibliography
Pearce, Romney Lyle. Autobiography of a Father

Occupations in music
Musical terminology